Quaker (or Quaker Point) is an unincorporated community in Vermillion Township, Vermillion County, in the U.S. state of Indiana.

History
The post office at Quaker was established in 1894 and discontinued in 1914. The community was originally built up chiefly by Quakers.

Geography

References

Unincorporated communities in Vermillion County, Indiana
Unincorporated communities in Indiana